SO or so may refer to:

Arts and entertainment

Music
 So (album), an album by Peter Gabriel
 So (band), a duo from the 1980s formed by two members of The Opposition
 "So" (Static-X song), a song by Static-X
 "Sō (New Love New World)", a song by Masaharu Fukuyama
 "So", a song by War from Why Can't We Be Friends?
 "So", a song by Fates Warning from Disconnected
 S.O. (rapper)

Other
 "SO" (Sons of Anarchy), the third season premiere of the FX television series Sons of Anarchy
 So Television, a British TV production company

Relationships 

 Significant other, a partner in an intimate relationship

Businesses
 Austrian Air Services (former IATA airline designator SO)
 Sosoliso Airlines (former IATA airline designator SO)
 Southern Airways (former IATA airline designator SO)
 Southern Company (stock symbol SO)
 Superior Aviation (IATA airline designator SO)

Language

 So language (Democratic Republic of Congo), a Bantu language
 Sô language, a Katuic language (Mon-Khmer) of Laos and Thailand
 Swo language, a Bantu language of Cameroon
 Soo language, a Kuliak language of Uganda
 Somali language (ISO 639 language code "so")
 So (kana), a Japanese kana
 So (word), an English word

Places
 So, Iran, a village in Isfahan Province, Iran
 Canton of Solothurn, Switzerland
 So Phisai District, Bueng Kan Province, Thailand
 SO postcode area, UK, the Southampton postcode area
 Somalia (ISO 3166-1 alpha-2 country code SO)
 South Otago, part of New Zealand's South Island
 Southern State Parkway, a highway in New York, United States

Science, technology, and mathematics

Computing
 .so, the top-level Internet domain of Somalia
 .so, a filename extension for a shared object (a dynamic library or module) in Unix and Linux
 Shift Out, an ASCII control character in computing
 Small-outline integrated circuit
 StackOverflow, a programming Q&A site

Mathematics
 SO (complexity), second-order logic in descriptive complexity
 Special orthogonal group, a subset of an orthogonal group
 SO(2), a term used in mathematics, the group of rotations about a fixed point in the Euclidean plane
 SO(3), a term used in mathematics, the group of rotations about a fixed point in three-dimensional Euclidean space
 SO(4), a term used in mathematics, the group of rotations about a fixed point in four-dimensional Euclidean space
 SO(5), a term used in mathematics, the special orthogonal group of degree 5 over the field R of real numbers
 SO(8), a term used in mathematics, the special orthogonal group acting on eight-dimensional Euclidean space

Physics and chemistry
 Sulfur monoxide
 SO(10) (physics), a term used in particle physics, one of the grand unified theories is based on the SO(10) Lie group

Names
 Sō, a Japanese surname and given name
 Su (surname) (/), a Chinese surname and a Korean surname derived from it
 So (Korean name) (蘇 or 邵)

Other uses
 So (סוֹא), King of Egypt, usually identified with Osorkon IV
 So (dairy product), a type of dairy product made in ancient Japan
 Sales order, an order received by a business from a customer
 Sao civilisation or So, an African civilisation and population that flourished from ca. the 6th century to ca. 15th century
 Shell on, a form of presentation in shrimp marketing
 Significant other, a partner in a romantic relationship
 Strikeout, in baseball

See also 
 Esso, an Exxon trade name, phonetic version of SO
 So and so (disambiguation)
 Só (disambiguation)
 S0 (disambiguation)